The 2005–06 ULEB Cup was the fourth season of the second-tier level European professional club basketball competition, the EuroCup. The EuroCup is the European-wide league level that is one tier below the EuroLeague level. Dynamo Moscow won the trophy, by defeating Aris TT Bank in the final, by a score of 73–60.

Teams

Regular season

Group A

Group B

Group C

Group D

Top 16 

|}
 Aris won after two overtimes. Full time 79-81, first overtime 92–94.

Quarter finals 

|}

Semi finals 

|}

Final 
April 11, Spiroudome, Charleroi

|}

Finals MVP
 Ruben Douglas (Dynamo Moscow)

References

External links
2005–06 ULEB Cup @ Eurocupbasketball.com

 
Uleb
EuroCup Basketball seasons